The Workers League was a small Trotskyist group in Britain.

It began as the IS Opposition, formed in 1975 within the International Socialists (now the Socialist Workers Party), and containing many prominent IS members, including Roger Protz and Jim Higgins.  They had several major disagreements with the IS leadership, including what they perceived as an increasingly ultra left stance, refusing to work with other socialist groups, and a reduction in internal democracy.

In December 1975 after campaigning for a Special Conference of IS, the faction's leaders were expelled. Following this a considerable number of IS members left the group including the influential engineering fraction in Birmingham.

A large number of former IS members, but crucially not all the ISO's leaders including Roger Protz and John Palmer, then regrouped around Jim Higgins to form the Workers' League basing themselves on what they described as the IS tradition with an orientation on rank and file work in the workplaces and unions which they alleged IS had abandoned. They published a newspaper, Workers News but membership swiftly eroded, for example a fraction based in West London declared itself for Labour Party entry and when their thesis was rejected decamped to that party.

In 1978, they seem to have dissolved themselves into the International Socialist Alliance and changed their publication into a magazine called Socialist Voice. Having lost Higgins and other leading cadre, sections of the group were increasingly attracted by the International Marxist Group's Socialist Unity campaign. A conference on Revolutionary Unity and the International Socialist tradition was organised by Martin Shaw, who was not a member of the WL, after which the group seems to have dissolved itself. The remaining members joined various groups including Big Flame and the IMG or simply dropped out of organised revolutionary politics.

Political parties established in 1975
Defunct Trotskyist organisations in the United Kingdom
1975 establishments in the United Kingdom
Socialist Workers Party (UK)